Poonam Devi Yadav is an Indian politician. She was elected to the Bihar Legislative Assembly from Khagaria as the 2005 Member of Bihar Legislative Assembly as a member of the Janata Dal (United). Her husband Ranveer Yadav was also elected to Bihar Legislative Assembly from Khagaria in the 1990–1995.

References

Bihar MLAs 2015–2020
1975 births
Living people
Janata Dal (United) politicians
Bihar MLAs 2005–2010
Bihar MLAs 2010–2015
People from Khagaria district